() is a type of naengmyeon (cold noodles) in Korean Chinese cuisine. The dish, consisting of icy cold broth with noodles, blanched seafood, fresh vegetables, and hard-boiled egg, is usually served with mustard and peanut sauce.

History 
Despite the name, the dish originated in Korea. The Korean Chinese dish incorporates the Korean tradition of serving noodles in icy cold broth (naengmyeon).

It is assumed that the dish was popularized in South Korea during the 1960s, when Chinese-style peanut sauce was largely replaced by peanut butter from U.S. military bases. In 1980s, high-end Korean Chinese restaurants in major hotels began to serve this dish.

Preparation and serving 
Chicken broth is usually used in jungguk-naengmyeon. The broth, seasoned with ginger, onion, and rice wine, is served chilled with Chinese-style wheat noodles and toppings. Mustard and peanut sauce are usually added to the dish. The peanut sauce gives the soup a thick, cream-colored, opaque look and nutty flavor. Common toppings include slices of boiled meat, blanched seafood, such as shrimp, jellyfish, and cuttlefish, vegetables, such as thinly sliced cucumber carrot, and tomato, as well as hard-boiled egg.

See also 
 Hiyashi chūka

References 

Cold noodles
Korean Chinese cuisine
Korean noodle dishes
Noodle soups